The Soweto Gospel Choir is a South African gospel group.

History

The Soweto Gospel Choir was formed in Soweto, South Africa, by David Mulovhedzi and Beverly Bryer, and producers Andrew Kay, David Vigo and Cliff Hocking in 2002. The more than 30-member ensemble blends elements of African gospel, Negro spirituals, reggae and American popular music. The group performed at the first of the 46664 concerts for Nelson Mandela and has since toured internationally several times.

Their albums Blessed, African Spirit and Freedom won the Grammy Award for Best Traditional World Music Album in 2006, 2007 and 2018, respectively.

On 7 July 2007 they performed at the South African leg of Live Earth.  Also in 2007, they joined Robert Plant in contributing to Goin' Home: A Tribute to Fats Domino (Vanguard Records), performing their version of Domino's "Valley of Tears".

The group was featured on the Peter Gabriel/Thomas Newman song "Down to Earth", written for Pixar's 2008 feature film WALL-E. The song was nominated for the Golden Globe Award for Best Original Song at the 66th Golden Globe Awards and the Academy Award for Best Original Song at the 81st Academy Awards.

The group performed at the 2010 FIFA World Cup final draw on 4 December 2009 in Cape Town, South Africa.

In 2010, composer Christopher Tin's song "Baba Yetu", which featured the group, won the Grammy Award for Best Instrumental Arrangement Accompanying Vocalist(s). The song had originally been produced for Firaxis Games's 2005 videogame Civilization IV, but Tin enlisted the Soweto Gospel Choir to re-record the song for inclusion on his debut album, Calling All Dawns,  leading to the song's nomination and award. This marked the first time a video game composition had won or been nominated for the category.

The group collaborates with American publishing company MusicSpoke to publish transcriptions of a number of its pieces, including "Balm of Gilead," "Hloholonofatsa," "Ke Na Le Modisa," "Khumbaya," "Shosholoza," "Somlandela," and "Swing Down Sweet Chariot."

Discography

 Voices from Heaven (Shanachie Records, 2005)
 Blessed (Shanachie, 2006)
 African Spirit (Shanachie, 2007)
 Grace (Shanachie, 2010)
 Freedom (Shanachie, 2018)
 Hope (Shanachie, 2022)

Contributions with Christopher Tin

Calling All Dawns (2009)
The Drop That Contained the Sea (2014)

Other contributions

Goin' Home: A Tribute to Fats Domino (Vanguard Records, 2007)
Pray for me: off the album "UNCLAD" by Nigeria's Darey Art Alade (2015)

References

External links
 [ Soweto Gospel Choir] at Allmusic.com.
 Official website
 SowetoGospelFans.com

A cappella musical groups
South African choirs
Grammy Award winners
Soweto
Culture of Johannesburg
Musical groups established in 2002
2002 establishments in South Africa